The soundtrack to the superhero film The Crow was released in 1994.

Album information
The album featured covers, including Nine Inch Nails who covered Joy Division's "Dead Souls", Pantera who covered Poison Idea's "The Badge", and Rollins Band who covered Suicide's "Ghost Rider", which is about a Marvel Comics character. Rage Against the Machine re-recorded their 1991 B-side "Darkness of Greed" and renamed it "Darkness" for this soundtrack. My Life with the Thrill Kill Kult re-recorded their original song, "Nervous Xians" and re-titled it, "After the Flesh" for this film. They were also the band onstage during the nightclub shootout scene. The Cure also wrote the song "Burn" for the movie.  Stone Temple Pilots originally intended to re-record a song off their Mighty Joe Young demo, titled "Only Dying", but instead chose to submit the track "Big Empty" to the project when Brandon Lee was accidentally killed on-set during production. Medicine re-recorded their song "Time Baby II" for the film's soundtrack album as "Time Baby III", which featured guest vocals by Elizabeth Fraser of Cocteau Twins, although the original version is performed by Medicine in the film. "It Can't Rain All the Time" was co-written by Jane Siberry and the film's composer Graeme Revell, performed by Siberry. An orchestral version of "It Can't Rain All the Time" can be heard in the film multiple times.

The inclusion of songs written by The Cure and Joy Division are notable because the influences of both bands are present in the original comic book. James O'Barr, the creator of The Crow, reprinted the lyrics to the song "The Hanging Garden" by The Cure on an entire page, and some chapters of the comic book are named after Joy Division songs – "Atmosphere" and "Atrocity Exhibition", for example. In one panel, Eric even quotes a lyric from the song "Disorder" from the album Unknown Pleasures. O'Barr was a big fan of both bands when he was creating the comic book.

The other music in the film which is not included in the soundtrack is instead on The Crow: Original Motion Picture Score of original, mostly orchestral music, with some electronic and guitar elements, written for the film by Graeme Revell.

Peaking at the top of the Billboard Top 200 Albums Chart, the album has sold 3.8 million copies in the United States, and has been certified 3x-Platinum by RIAA.

Track listing

Charts

Weekly charts

Year-end charts

Certifications

References

External links
 

Action film soundtracks
Albums produced by Butch Vig
1994 soundtrack albums
Atlantic Records soundtracks
The Crow
Superhero film soundtracks